Langona pilosa is a jumping spider species in the genus Langona that lives in Namibia. The male was first described by Wanda Wesołowska in 2006 and the female in 2011.

References

Endemic fauna of Namibia
Fauna of Namibia
Salticidae
Spiders of Africa
Spiders described in 2006
Taxa named by Wanda Wesołowska